Phyllidiopsis cardinalis is a species of sea slug, a dorid nudibranch, a shell-less marine gastropod mollusk in the family Phyllidiidae.

References

Phyllidiidae
Gastropods described in 1876